The Land of the Cross-Tipped Churches is a rural region in the western part of the U.S. state of Ohio, centered near Maria Stein in Mercer County. Its name is derived from the dense concentration of large Catholic churches that dominate the area's architecture. These and other buildings were constructed by the Society of the Most Precious Blood under the oversight of the missionary priest Francis de Sales Brunner. Under his leadership, the Society founded many churches and schools in the region, as well as several seminaries.  

The earliest buildings from the mid-19th century were mostly small wooden or simple brick structures.  Most of these were replaced in later construction periods; only two from this generation are still in use as churches.

Many of the massive Gothic revival churches that remain today were built in the late 19th century and early 20th century by Anton DeCurtins or his descendants.  The churches of the region have changed little since the early 20th century, and only one new parish has been established since 1925.

Historic buildings

In 1976, many churches in the Land of the Cross-Tipped Churches were added to the National Register of Historic Places, along with a small number of church-related buildings.  These buildings are detailed in the chart below; each is listed under the name by which it appears on the Register.

References

External Links
Lamott, John H.  History of the Archdiocese of Cincinnati: 1821–1921.  New York and Cincinnati: Pustet, 1921.
Land of Cross Tipped Churches Postcards Available at Miami University of Ohio Digital Collections

Ohio culture
Regions of Ohio
Catholic Church in the United States